Yangguanzhai is an archaeological site discovered in 2004 at Gaoling County, Shaanxi Province. The site is associated with the Miaodigou phase (4000-3000 BC) of the Yangshao culture. As of 2009, survey data suggests the cultural remains at Yangguanzhai cover an area of over 800,000 square meters, making it one of the largest Neolithic sites in China.

Archaeology
Since 2004, excavations on the site were conducted by the Shaanxi Provincial Institute of Archaeology and the Institute for Field Research.

References

Archaeological sites in China
Neolithic settlements
Former populated places in China
Archaeological type sites
Buildings and structures in Shaanxi
2004 archaeological discoveries
4th millennium BC
Yangshao culture